The Electronic Registration Information Center (ERIC) is non-profit, organization in the United States that is operated and financed by state elections agencies and chief elections officials.

Operations 

At least every 60 days, each ERIC state submits their voter registration data and motor vehicle licensing data to ERIC. ERIC's technical staff matches that data against data from all the other member states and Social Security death data. ERIC identifies voters who have moved, voters who have died, and voters with duplicate registrations within a state's database. States may also request National Change of Address (NCOA) reports using official data from the US Postal Service and, after federal general elections, participate in a fraud check to see if voters cast ballots in more than one state. ERIC also, by matching voter data against motor vehicle licensing data, identifies individuals who are not yet registered so election officials can provide information on how to register to vote.

States joining ERIC have agreed to pursue non-partisan and protective goals. Participating states are required to mail notifications to people identified as eligible to vote but not registered. Between 2012 and 2018, ERIC identified 26 million persons who were eligible to cast ballots but were not registered to vote, as well as 10 million registered voters who had moved, or who appeared on more than one list. Follow-up research in some states concluded that 10% to 20% of those contacted had later registered to vote, a high response rate for direct mailings. That rate suggests 2.6 million to 5.2 million of the 26 million people notified became voters. ERIC’s list maintenance reports help states improve the accuracy of their voter lists by identifying voters who have moved within the state, voters who have moved from one ERIC state to another, voters who have died, and voters with duplicate registrations in the state. ERIC's Membership Agreement requires each state to request and act on at least one of these reports at a minimum of once a year, though the ERIC Membership Agreement strongly encourages states to establish a regular schedule for requesting these reports. States must act on these reports in a manner that complies with applicable federal and state law. ERIC's website publishes statistics (https://ericstates.org/statistics/) on the number of deceased voters, in-state and out-of-state movers, and duplicate registrations that it has reported to member states.Some state administrators said determining a person's current domicile can present problems. Member states report that "false positives" are rare. Unopened returned mail—evidence of a wrong address—is substantially reduced.

History 

States created ERIC to improve the accuracy of state voter registration rolls and boost access to voter registration for all American citizens. ERIC, with logistical and financial support from the Pew Charitable Trusts, was launched in 2012 by elections officials from seven states. Membership has grown to 30 states and the District of Columbia. The Pew Charitable Trusts, although integral to the creation of ERIC, now has no role with ERIC.

The seven states that created ERIC in 2012 were Colorado, Delaware, Maryland, Nevada, Utah, Virginia, and Washington. By 2019, Alabama, Alaska, Arizona, Connecticut,  Florida, Georgia, Illinois, Iowa, Kentucky, Louisiana, Michigan, Minnesota, Missouri, New Mexico, Ohio, Oregon, Pennsylvania, Rhode Island, South Carolina, Vermont, West Virginia, and Wisconsin had joined the partnership, with Texas joining in March 2020 and Oklahoma adopting legislation to join in April, 2021. ERIC's matching software was developed by data scientist Jeff Jonas.  In the 2020-2021 fiscal year, its budget was slightly more than $1 million.

Various far-right campaigns opposing the program have emerged since 2022. According to The New York Times, ERIC received seed funding from the Pew Charitable Trusts, to which businessman George Soros had previously donated. As a result, opponents of ERIC accused the program of being a "voter registration vehicle for Democrats". However, the Pew Charitable Trusts' funds towards ERIC were separate from Soros' donations.

Five states have withdrawn from the program since joining it; in January 2022, Secretary of State of Louisiana Kyle Ardoin announced that Louisiana would suspend its participation in ERIC, then fully withdrew in July 2022. Alabama withdrew from the program in January 2023, as Secretary of State of Alabama Wes Allen made exiting ERIC one of his campaign issues. Florida, Missouri, and West Virginia announced their withdrawals on March 6, 2023.

In February 2023, Alabama Secretary of State Wes Allen, who had previously withdrawn Alabama from ERIC, released a statement in which he reported that he had visited ERIC's given address for their offices. Allen said that he found the offices totally vacant with "no ERIC presence of any kind", instead that it was a rentable "virtual office". ERIC executive director Shane Hamlin responded by stating that the address was meant only for mailing purposes, and that ERIC never had physical brick and mortar offices since its founding. According to ERIC's website, ERIC does not disclose the location of any of its servers for safety reasons.

Governance 

Each jurisdiction has a member's seat on the ERIC Board of Directors. The Board has created an executive committee and advisory committees to assist with issues related to data security and research. Key responsibilities of the Board of Directors include approving the annual budget, setting annual membership dues, and a periodic review of ERIC's Information Security Plan and policies. ERIC is governed by bylaws and a membership agreement that each state must sign before joining.

See also 
 Interstate Voter Registration Crosscheck Program (defunct)

References

External links
 Electronic Registration Information Center

History of voting rights in the United States
Voter databases
Voter registration
2012 establishments in the United States